Bautista Basso (born January 18, 2001) is an Uruguayan rugby union player. Basso has played for both the Uruguay national rugby sevens team and the Uruguay national rugby union team. He has represented the Uruguay sevens team on the World Rugby Sevens Series.

Personal
Basso was educated at The British Schools of Montevideo.

Career
Basso represents Peñarol Rugby in the Super Liga Americana de Rugby. He was first called up to the Uruguay national squad in June 2022. He debuted for Uruguay starting at wing in a 7–43 loss against Japan on June 25 in the 2022 mid-year rugby union tests. He got his next cap in July 17, 2022, coming in as a substitute in Uruguay’s win against Romania.

References

Uruguay international rugby union players
Living people
2001 births
People educated at The British Schools of Montevideo